See All is a summit in West Virginia, in the United States.

The etymology is See All is uncertain; it may be so named for the mountain scenery, or the name may be derived from the name Sewell.

References

Mountains of Pocahontas County, West Virginia
Mountains of West Virginia